Stroeve is a surname. Notable people with the surname include:

Julienne Stroeve, American climatologist
Roy Stroeve (born 1977), former professional footballer